Blood on Wolf Mountain, also known as The Wolf Hill, Bloodbath in Langshan, and Bloodshed on Wolf Mountain, is a Chinese film directed by acclaimed Shanghainese film director Fei Mu. Made just prior to the commencement of full-scale war with Imperial Japan, the film itself is often considered an allegory of conflict between China and Japan that had been going on intermittently since the Invasion of Manchuria in 1931. The film was produced by the Lianhua Film Company and was released in November 1936.

Plot 
The film tells the story of a village that is beset by a pack of wolves. Though the symbolism was clear, the Japanese themselves refused to acknowledge that they could be represented by blood-thirsty wolves.

Cast 
Blood on Wolf Mountain starred actresses Li Lili, and Lan Ping (who later in life would adopt the name Jiang Qing and gain notoriety as the wife of Mao Zedong and a member of the Gang of Four).

See also
Second Sino-Japanese War, the political background behind Blood on Wolf Mountain
Cinema of China
The first episode of BBC documentary Can't Get You Out of My Head by Adam Curtis is called Bloodshed on Wolf Mountain.

References

External links

Blood on Wolf Mountain at the Chinese Movie Database

1936 films
1936 drama films
Chinese drama films
Chinese black-and-white films
1930s Mandarin-language films
Second Sino-Japanese War films
Lianhua Film Company films
Films directed by Fei Mu